The following is an alphabetical list of articles related to the territory of the United States Virgin Islands.

0–9

.vi – Internet country code top-level domain for the United States Virgin Islands

A
Agriculture in the United States Virgin Islands
Airports in the United States Virgin Islands
Americas
North America
North Atlantic Ocean
West Indies
Caribbean Sea
Antilles
Lesser Antilles
Virgin Islands
United States Virgin Islands
Anglo-America
Antilles
Arboreta in the United States Virgin Islands
commons:Category:Arboreta in the United States Virgin Islands
Archaeology of the United States Virgin Islands
Area code 340
Atlantic Ocean
Atlas of the United States Virgin Islands

B
Beaches of the United States Virgin Islands
commons:Category:Beaches of the United States Virgin Islands
Botanical gardens in the United States Virgin Islands
commons:Category:Botanical gardens in the United States Virgin Islands
British Virgin Islands
Buildings and structures in the United States Virgin Islands
commons:Category:Buildings and structures in the United States Virgin Islands

C
Capital of the United States Virgin Islands:  Charlotte Amalie on Saint Thomas
Caribbean
Caribbean Sea
Categories:
:Category:United States Virgin Islands
:Category:Buildings and structures in the United States Virgin Islands
:Category:Communications in the United States Virgin Islands
:Category:Economy of the United States Virgin Islands
:Category:Education in the United States Virgin Islands
:Category:Environment of the United States Virgin Islands
:Category:Geography of the United States Virgin Islands
:Category:Government of the United States Virgin Islands
:Category:History of the United States Virgin Islands
:Category:Military in the United States Virgin Islands
:Category:Politics of the United States Virgin Islands
:Category:Sports in the United States Virgin Islands
:Category:Transportation in the United States Virgin Islands
:Category:United States Virgin Islands culture
:Category:United States Virgin Islands people
:Category:United States Virgin Islands society
:Category:United States Virgin Islands stubs
:Category:United States Virgin Islands-related lists
commons:Category:United States Virgin Islands
Charlotte Amalie on Saint Thomas – Capital of the United States Virgin Islands since 1871
Christopher Columbus - Cristoforo Colombo - Cristóbal Colón
Cities in the United States Virgin Islands
commons:Category:Cities in the United States Virgin Islands
Climate of the United States Virgin Islands
Coat of arms of the United States Virgin Islands
Colleges and universities in the United States Virgin Islands
commons:Category:Universities and colleges in the United States Virgin Islands
Communications in the United States Virgin Islands
:Category:Communications in the United States Virgin Islands
commons:Category:Communications in the United States Virgin Islands
Constitution of the United States Virgin Islands
Coral Bay, United States Virgin Islands
Cruz Bay, United States Virgin Islands
Cuisine of the United States Virgin Islands
Culture of the Virgin Islands

D
Danish colonization of the Americas
Danish West India Company
Danish West Indies
Delegates to the United States House of Representatives from U.S. Virgin Islands
Demographics of the United States Virgin Islands

E
Economy of the United States Virgin Islands
:Category:Economy of the United States Virgin Islands
commons:Category:Economy of the United States Virgin Islands
Education in the United States Virgin Islands
:Category:Education in the United States Virgin Islands
commons:Category:Education in the United States Virgin Islands
Elections in the United States Virgin Islands*Electoral reform in the United States Virgin Islands
Energy in the United States Virgin Islands
English language
Environment of the United States Virgin Islands
commons:Category:Environment of the United States Virgin Islands

F

Flag of the United States Virgin Islands
Forts in the United States Virgin Islands
Fort Christian
:Category:Forts in the United States Virgin Islands
commons:Category:Forts in the United States Virgin Islands

G

Gardens in the United States Virgin Islands
commons:Category:Gardens in the United States Virgin Islands
Geography of the United States Virgin Islands
:Category:Geography of the United States Virgin Islands
commons:Category:Geography of the United States Virgin Islands
Government of the United States Virgin Islands  website
:Category:Government of the United States Virgin Islands
commons:Category:Government of the United States Virgin Islands
Governor of the United States Virgin Islands
List of governors of the Danish West Indies
List of governors of the United States Virgin Islands
Seal of the United States Virgin Islands
Gross domestic product

H
Healthcare in the United States Virgin Islands
Higher education in the United States Virgin Islands
Highways of the United States Virgin Islands
History of the United States Virgin Islands
Historical outline of the United States Virgin Islands
:Category:History of the United States Virgin Islands
commons:Category:History of the United States Virgin Islands
:Category:Hotels in the United States Virgin Islands

I
Images of the United States Virgin Islands
International Organization for Standardization (ISO)
ISO 3166-1 alpha-2 country code for the United States Virgin Islands: VI
ISO 3166-1 alpha-3 country code for the United States Virgin Islands: VIR
Internet in the United States Virgin Islands
Islands of the United States Virgin Islands:
Saint Croix
Buck Island (Saint Croix, United States Virgin Islands)
Green Cay (Saint Croix, United States Virgin Islands)
Ruth Island
Saint John, United States Virgin Islands
Flanagan Island
Waterlemon Cay
Saint Thomas, United States Virgin Islands
Buck Island (Saint Thomas, United States Virgin Islands)
Capella Island
Green Cay (Saint Thomas, United States Virgin Islands)
Hans Lollik Island
Hans Lollik Rock
Hassel Island, U.S. Virgin Islands
Little Hans Lollik Island
Thatch Cay, U.S. Virgin Islands
Water Island, U.S. Virgin Islands
Barrel of Beef
Blinders Rocks
Booby Rock
Bovoni Cay
Calf Rock
Carval Rock
Cas Cay
Cinnamon Cay
Cockroach Island (United States Virgin Islands)
Coculus Rock
Cololoba Cay
Congo Cay
Cow Rock
Cricket Rock
Current Rock
Dog Island (United States Virgin Islands)
Dog Rocks
Domkirk Rock
Dry Rock
Durloe Cays
Dut Cheap Cay
Fish Cay
Flat Cays
Gorret Rock
Grass Cay
Great Saint James Island
Henley Cay
Inner Brass Island
Kalkun Cay
Leduck Island
Limestone Rock
Little Saint James Island
Lizard Rocks
Lovango Cay
Mingo Cay
Outer Brass Island
Packet Rock
Patricia Cay
Pelican Cay
Perkins Cay
Porpoise Rocks
Protestant Cay
Ramgoat Cay
Rata Cay
Rotto Cay
Rupert Rock
Saba Island (United States Virgin Islands)
Salt Cay (United States Virgin Islands)
Saltwater Money Rock
Sandy Point Rock
Savana Island
Shark Island (United States Virgin Islands)
Skipper Jacob Rock
Steven Cay
Sula Cay
The Stragglers
Triangle Island
Trunk Cay
Turtleback Rock
Turtledove Cay
Two Brothers (United States Virgin Islands)
Welk Rocks
West Cay
Whistling Cay

J

K

L
Landmarks in the United States Virgin Islands
commons:Category:Landmarks in the United States Virgin Islands
Languages of the United States Virgin Islands
Law enforcement in the United States Virgin Islands
Leeward Islands
Lesser Antilles
Lieutenant Governor of the United States Virgin Islands
Lists related to the United States Virgin Islands:
Historical outline of the United States Virgin Islands
List of airports in the United States Virgin Islands
List of cities in the United States Virgin Islands
List of colleges and universities in the United States Virgin Islands
List of countries by GDP (nominal)
List of Delegates to the United States House of Representatives from U.S. Virgin Islands
List of forts in the United States Virgin Islands
List of governors of the Danish West Indies
List of governors of the United States Virgin Islands
List of highways in the United States Virgin Islands
List of islands of the United States Virgin Islands
List of newspapers in the United States Virgin Islands
List of people from the United States Virgin Islands
List of political parties in the United States Virgin Islands
List of radio stations in the United States Virgin Islands
List of reggae bands from the Virgin Islands
List of Registered Historic Places in the United States Virgin Islands
List of rivers of the United States Virgin Islands
List of Superfund sites in the United States Virgin Islands
List of United States Virgin Islands Senators
List of United States Virgin Islands-related topics

M
Military in the United States Virgin Islands
Minor islands of the United States Virgin Islands
Music of the Virgin Islands

N
Natural history of the United States Virgin Islands
commons:Category:Natural history of the United States Virgin Islands
Negerhollands
Newspapers in the United States Virgin Islands
North America
Northern Hemisphere

O

P
People from the United States Virgin Islands
:Category:United States Virgin Islands people 
commons:Category:People from the United States Virgin Islands
United States Virgin Islands people by occupation
Politics of the United States Virgin Islands
Political parties in the United States Virgin Islands
:Category:Politics of the United States Virgin Islands
commons:Category:Politics of the United States Virgin Islands
:Category:Political parties in the United States Virgin Islands

Protected areas of the United States Virgin Islands
commons:Category:Protected areas of the United States Virgin Islands
Powerball (multi-jurisdictional lottery)

Q

R
Radio stations in the United States Virgin Islands
Reggae in the Virgin Islands
Reggae bands from the Virgin Islands
Registered historic places in the United States Virgin Islands
commons:Category:Registered Historic Places in the United States Virgin Islands
Religion in the United States Virgin Islands
commons:Category:Religion in the United States Virgin Islands
Rivers of the United States Virgin Islands
commons:Category:Rivers of the United States Virgin Islands

S
Saint Croix
Saint John
Saint Thomas
Scouting in the United States Virgin Islands
Seal of the United States Virgin Islands
Senators of the United States Virgin Islands
Category:Settlements in the United States Virgin Islands
Slavery in the Danish West Indies
Sports in the United States Virgin Islands
commons:Category:Sports in the United States Virgin Islands
:Category:Soccer venues in the United States Virgin Islands
Structures in the United States Virgin Islands
commons:Category:Buildings and structures in the United States Virgin Islands
Superfund sites in the United States Virgin Islands

T
Telecommunications in the United States Virgin Islands
:Category:Communications in the United States Virgin Islands
commons:Category:Communications in the United States Virgin Islands
Telephone area code 340
Television stations in the United States Virgin Islands
United States Virgin Islands  website
Government of the United States Virgin Islands
:Category:Government of the United States Virgin Islands
commons:Category:Government of the United States Virgin Islands
Legislature of the Virgin Islands
List of United States Virgin Islands Senators
List of United States Virgin Islands Governors
List of Governors of the Danish West Indies
United States Virgin Islands Police Department
United States Virgin Islands Superior Court
United States Virgin Islands Supreme Court
:Category:Government of the United States Virgin Islands
commons:Category:Government of the United States Virgin Islands
Timelines:
Historical outline of the United States Virgin Islands
Topic outline of the United States Virgin Islands
Tourism in the United States Virgin Islands  website 
commons:Category:Tourism in the United States Virgin Islands
Transportation on the United States Virgin Islands
:Category:Transportation in the United States Virgin Islands
commons:Category:Transport in the United States Virgin Islands

U
United States of America
District Court of the United States Virgin Islands
List of Delegates to the United States House of Representatives from U.S. Virgin Islands
Political divisions of the United States
United States Court of Appeals for the Third Circuit
United States Virgin Islands's At-large congressional district
United States Virgin Islands  website
:Category:United States Virgin Islands
commons:Category:United States Virgin Islands
:Category:United States Virgin Islands society
commons:Category:United States Virgin Islands society
United States Virgin Islands Police Department
Universities and colleges in the United States Virgin Islands
University of the Virgin Islands
commons:Category:Universities and colleges in the United States Virgin Islands

V
VI – United States Postal Service postal code for the United States Virgin Islands
Virgin Islander American
Virgin Islands
British Virgin Islands
United States Virgin Islands
Virgin Islands Air National Guard
Virgin Islands Creole

W
Water Island
West Indies
Western Hemisphere
Wikimedia
commons:Atlas of the United States Virgin Islands
commons:Category:United States Virgin Islands
commons:Category:Maps of the United States Virgin Islands
Wikinews:Category:United States Virgin Islands
Wikinews:Portal:United States Virgin Islands
Wikipedia Category:United States Virgin Islands
Portal:United States Virgin Islands
Wikipedia:WikiProject Caribbean/United States Virgin Islands work group
Wikipedia:WikiProject Caribbean/United States Virgin Islands work group#Recognized content
Wikipedia:WikiProject Caribbean/United States Virgin Islands work group#Participants
Wikipedia:WikiProject Topic outline/Drafts/Topic outline of the United States Virgin Islands

X

Y

Z

See also

Topic overview:
United States Virgin Islands
Outline of the United States Virgin Islands

Bibliography of the United States Virgin Islands

References

External links

 
United States Virgin Islands